Lithuanian has eleven vowels and 45 consonants, including 22 pairs of consonants distinguished by the presence or absence of palatalization. Most vowels come in pairs which are differentiated through length and degree of centralization.

Only one syllable in the word bears the accent, but exactly which syllable is often unpredictable. Accented syllables are marked with either a falling or rising tone. Its location in a word may also be affected during inflection.

Consonants

All Lithuanian consonants except  have two variants: a non-palatalized one and a palatalized one, represented by the IPA symbols in the chart (i.e.,  – ,  – ,  – , and so on). Most of the non-palatalized and palatalized consonants form minimal pairs (like šuo , 'dog' ~ šiuo , 'with this one'), so they are independent phonemes, rather than allophones.
 All consonants are labialized before the back vowels . The hard alveolar fricatives  are also somewhat labialized in other positions.
 All of the hard consonants (especially ) are velarized.
  are laminal denti-alveolar .
  are alveolar  before .
  has been variously described as palatalized laminal denti-alveolar  and palatalized laminal alveolar .
  have been variously described as:
Alveolo-palatal 
 Palatalized laminal denti-alveolar  with alveolar allophones  before .
 Word-final  and sometimes also  are aspirated .
  are dentalized laminal alveolar , pronounced with the blade of the tongue very close to the upper front teeth, with the tip of the tongue resting behind lower front teeth.
  are laminal flat postalveolar , i.e. they are pronounced without any palatalization at all.
  are alveolo-palatal .
  have been variously described as fricatives  and approximants .
  is laminal denti-alveolar .
  has been variously described as palatalized alveolar  and palatalized laminal denti-alveolar .
  has been variously described as an approximant  and a fricative .
  are apical alveolar .
 Before ,  is realized as velar .
 In the case of the soft velar consonants  (as well as the  allophone of ), the softness (palatalization) is realized as slight fronting of the place of articulation to post-palatal .
 Plosives have no audible release before other plosives.

Vowels
Lithuanian has six long vowels and four short ones (not including the disputed  and ). Length has traditionally been considered the distinctive feature, though short vowels are also more centralized and long vowels more peripheral:

  are restricted to loanwords.
  are phonetically central . Phonologically, they behave like back vowels.

In standard Lithuanian vowels  and  generally are not pronounced after any palatalized consonant (including ).

This phenomenon does not affect short vowels.

Diphthongs
Lithuanian is traditionally described as having nine diphthongs, ai, au, ei, eu, oi, ou, ui, ie, and uo. However, some approaches (i.e., Schmalstieg 1982) treat them as vowel sequences rather than diphthongs; indeed, the longer component depends on the type of stress, whereas in diphthongs, the longer segment is fixed.

Lithuanian long stressed syllables can have either a rising or a falling tone. In specialized literature, they are marked with a tilde  or an acute accent  respectively. The tone is especially clearly audible in diphthongs, since in the case of the rising tone, it makes the second element longer (e.g., aĩ is pronounced ), while the falling tone prolongs the first element (e.g., ái is pronounced ) (for more detailed information, see Lithuanian accentuation). The full set is as follows:

Pitch accent

The Lithuanian prosodic system is characterized by free accent and distinctive quantity. Its accentuation is sometimes described as a simple tone system, often called pitch accent. In lexical words, one syllable will be tonically prominent. A heavy syllable—that is, a syllable containing a long vowel, diphthong, or a sonorant coda—may have one of two tones, falling tone (or acute tone) or rising tone (or circumflex tone). Light syllables (syllables with short vowels and optionally also obstruent codas) do not have the two-way contrast of heavy syllables.

Common Lithuanian lexicographical practice uses three diacritic marks to indicate word accent, i.e., the tone and quantity of the accented syllable. They are used in the following way:
 The first (or the only) segment of a heavy syllable with a falling tone is indicated with an acute accent mark (e.g., á, ár), unless the first element is i or u followed by a tautosyllabic resonant, in which case it is marked with a grave accent mark (e.g., ìr, ùr).
 The second (or the only) segment of a heavy syllable with a rising tone is indicated with a circumflex accent (e.g., ã, ar̃)
 Short accented syllables are indicated with a grave accent mark (e.g., ì, ù).

As said, Lithuanian has a free accent, which means that its position and type is not phonologically predictable and has to be learned by heart. This is the state of affairs inherited from Proto-Balto-Slavic and, to a lesser extent, from Proto-Indo-European; Lithuanian circumflex and acute syllables directly reflect Proto-Balto-Slavic acute and circumflex tone opposition.

In a word-final position, the tonal distinction in heavy syllables is almost neutralized, with a few minimal pairs remaining such as šáuk, ('shoot!'), vs. šaũk, ('shout!)'. In other syllables, the two-way contrast can be illustrated with pairs such as: kóšė ('porridge') vs. kõšė ('it soured'); áušti ('to cool') vs. aũšti ('to dawn'); drímba ('lout') vs. drim̃ba ('it falls'); káltas ('was hit with a hammer') vs. kal̃tas ('guilty'), týrė ('[he/she] explored') vs. tỹrė ('mush').

Kóšė is perceived as having a falling pitch ( or ), and indeed acoustic measurement strongly supports this. However, while kõšė is perceived as having a rising pitch ( or ), this is not supported acoustically; measurements do not find a consistent tone associated with such syllables that distinguish them from unaccented heavy syllables. The distinguishing feature appears to be a negative one, that they do not have a falling tone.

If diphthongs (and truly long vowels) are treated as sequences of vowels, then a single stress mark is sufficient for transcription: áušta  >  ('it cools') vs. aũšta  >  ('it dawns'); kóšė  >  ('porridge') vs. kõšė  >  ('it soured').

The Lithuanian accentual system inherited another very important aspect from the Proto-Balto-Slavic period, and that is the accentual mobility. Accents can alternate throughout the inflection of a word by both the syllable position and type. Parallels can be drawn with some modern Slavic languages, namely Russian, Serbo-Croatian and Slovene. Accentual mobility is prominent in nominal stems, while verbal stems mostly demonstrate phonologically predictable patterns.

Lithuanian nominal stems are commonly divided into four accentual classes, usually referred to by their numbers:
 Accent paradigm 1: Fixed (columnar) accent on a non-desinential syllable. If the accent is on a pre-desinential syllable, it carries the acute tone.
 Accent paradigm 2: Alternation of accent on a short or circumflex pre-desinential syllable with desinential accentuation.
 Accent paradigm 3: Alternation of accent on a non-desinential syllable with desinential accentuation. If the accent is on a pre-desinential syllable, it carries the acute tone.
 Accent paradigm 4: Alternation of accent on short or circumflex pre-desinential syllable with desinential accentuation.

The previously described accentual system primarily applies to the Western Aukštaitian dialect on which the standard Lithuanian literary language is based. The speakers of the other group of Lithuanian dialects – Samogitian – have a very different accentual system, and they do not adopt standard accentuation when speaking the standard idiom. Speakers of the major cities, such as Vilnius, Kaunas and Klaipėda, with mixed populations generally do not have intonational oppositions in spoken language, even when they speak the standard idiom.

Change and variation
The changes and variation in Lithuanian phonetics include diachronic changes of a quality of a phoneme, alternations, dialectal variation, variation between corresponding sounds of individual inflectional morphemes of the same grammatical category, which is at the same time qualitative and quantitative, diachronic and synchronic.

The diachronic qualitative phonemic changes include o  ← ā (a narrowing of a more open vowel), uo ← ō turnings.
Among examples of the variation between sounds of different inflectional morphemes of a certain grammatical category there is historical shortening of a declensional ending a in some positions: motina ('mother' nom. sg.-instr. sg.) < *mātina < *mātinā, *mātinās > motinos (gen. sg.). Synchronous variation between shorter (more recent) and longer (more archaic) personal endings in verbs, depending on final position: keliu ('I am lifting something')' – keliuosi ('I am getting up' reflexive); keli ('you are lifting')  – kelsi ('you get up'); keliame ('we are lifting) ' – keliamės ('we get up').
Variation between a lengthened, uttered in a falling, lengthened tone and a short a and e alike (only if these sounds end a syllable), variation between a long, uttered in a falling, lengthened tone and a short i at an ending of a word, depending on accentual position: vãkaras  nominative 'an evening', vakarè  locative 'in the evening'; radinỹs  nom. 'a finding, a find', rãdinio  genitive (from ràsti  'to find'); pãtiekalas 'a dish, course', patiekalaĩ nom. plural. (from patiẽkti 'to serve (a dish)'); vèsti 'to lead; to marry' vedìmas (a noun for an action) vẽdamas (participle) 'who is being led; married'; baltinỹs 'cloth which is being whitened', baltìnis 'white; (dial.) white of the egg' (derivatives from baltas 'white').

Variation in sounds takes place in word formation. Some examples:

The examples in the table are given as an overview, the word formation comprises many words not given here, for example, any verb can have an adjective made by the same pattern: sverti – svarus 'valid; ponderous'; svirti – svarùs 'slopable'; vyti – vajùs 'for whom it is characteristic to chase or to be chased'; pilti – pilùs 'poury'; but for example visti – vislùs 'prolific' (not visus, which could conflict with an adjective of a similar form visas 'all, entire, whole'). Many verbs, besides a noun derivative with the ending -i̇̀mas, can have different derivatives of the same meaning: pilti – pyli̇̀mas, pylà, pỹlis (they mean the act of the verb: a pouring (of any non solid material)); the first two have meanings that look almost identical but are drawn apart from a direct link with the verb: pylimas 'a bank, an embankment', pylà 'pelting; spanking, whipping'; the word svõris 'a weight', for example, does not have the meaning of an act of weighing. There are also many other derivatives and patterns of derivation.

References

Bibliography

 
 
 
 
 
 

Lithuanian language
Baltic phonologies